General elections were held in Panama on May 3, 2009.

Presidential race 
Balbina Herrera was the Democratic Revolutionary Party (PRD) candidate for President of Panama. She had previously served as President of the National Assembly of Panama during the Mireya Moscoso presidency and Housing Minister under outgoing president Martin Torrijos. Herrera won her party's primary on September 7, 2008, defeating Panama City Mayor Juan Carlos Navarro with a ten-point lead.  The Liberal Party and the People's Party were in alliance with the PRD in support of Herrera. Herrera was also endorsed by Ruben Blades, a popular salsa musician who had previously run for president and served as Torrijos' Minister of Tourism, and was initially considered the favorite for the presidency. If elected, she would have become Panama's second female president.

Ricardo Martinelli was the candidate of the opposition Democratic Change, also supported by the Patriotic Union Party, the Panameñista Party and the Nationalist Republican Liberal Movement. Martinelli was a successful businessman, and was the chairman of the board of Panama's Super 99 supermarket chain. During the presidency of Ernesto Pérez Balladares, Martinelli had served as Director of Social Security from 1994 to 1996.  From September 1999 to January 2003, he had served in the Moscoso Administration as Chairman of the Board of Directors of the Panama Canal and as the Minister for Canal Affairs.

Guillermo Endara, former Panamanian president from 1989 to 1994, ran as the candidate for the Fatherland's Moral Vanguard Party.

Though initially the favorite, Herrera was damaged in the election by her links to former military ruler Manuel Noriega and by the perception that she was a "Chavista", a supporter of leftist Venezuelan president Hugo Chavez. Martinelli was also helped by strong support from the business community and his campaign promise of "real change" resonated among poor voters.

On May 3, 2009, Martinelli won the national elections by a landslide, with over 60% of the votes compared to Herrera, who received about 36%. Former president Guillermo Endara finished a distant third. Martinelli was declared the winner after 43.68% of the votes had been counted. This was the second-largest majority in Panamanian history, and the largest since 1989. Martinelli's victory was an exception to a trend of victories for left-leaning Latin American candidates. He was sworn in on July 1, 2009.

Results

President

Legislative Assembly

References

External links
Official presidential results

General election
Panama
Elections in Panama
Presidential elections in Panama